James Walker (born November 30, 1944) is a former American football coach.  He was the 20th head football coach at Kentucky State University in Frankfort, Kentucky, serving for the 1985 season, and compiling a record of 0–11.

References

1944 births
Living people
Kentucky State Thorobreds football coaches